Overmedication is an overutilization of medication wherein a patient takes voluntarily, or is prescribed, unnecessary or excessive medications. While not strictly a medical condition, common symptoms may include: slurred speech, drowsiness, confusion, and poor motor skills. Hence it is a risk factor for falls, especially among the elderly. Children with behavior problems are also at risk of overmedication, with parents wanting an easy fix, and drug companies and doctors often obliging.

Overmedication in the elderly
A report in 2018 by Human Rights Watch, found that every week in American nursing homes, around 180,000 residents are given antipsychotic drugs who do not have the diagnosis for which the drugs are approved. Most of these people have behavioral issues or some form of dementia. The drugs are often administered without informed consent. The reason these drugs are administered is for the sedative effect, which makes the patients docile and easier to manage.

Overmedication in children
The overmedication of children has dramatically risen with those between the ages of 2 and 5 years old who are being prescribed atypical antipsychotics for bipolar disorders, developmental disabilities, ADHD, and behavior disorders. Drug companies have benefited considerably with profits made in sales for drugs such as stimulants for hyperactive children, with half a million children in the United States receiving medication.  Children have become more involved with technology resulting in less play time outside and less time spent with parents. The long hours children spend with technology has impacted their attachment development, sensory and motor development, along with socialization skills, in return causing behavioral and psychological disorders and learning disabilities being diagnosed by psychotropic medication.

If parents monitor their child's behavior and regulate their environment, it can help to prevent any future affective disorders. Medication is often prescribed to these children; however, it alone will not teach a child to create more valuable relationships at home or in the community. Other forms of intervention can be applied to supplement the effects of medication therapy and teach the child self-regulatory behaviors and healthy coping skills. The increase of psychiatric medication of children may be a result of the declining support for caregiving, leading to psychopathology in which drugs are oftentimes the go to method of treatment. Families do not always have knowledge regarding or the means to pursue other methods of intervention such as one-on-one therapy with the child, family therapy and parenting counseling that can teach effective parenting strategies to meet their child's specific needs. There is debate that healthcare professionals have been put under pressure to perform proficiently causing the influence of piecemeal polypharmacy.

Overprescription
A related issue is overprescription, which occurs when doctors give prescription drugs to patients who do not need them. Antibiotics are a common example, as are narcotic painkillers. Aggressive marketing by drug companies is sometimes cited as a reason for overprescription.

Undiagnosing medical conditions to prevent overprescribing
Some diagnoses do not hold important clinical implications. These conditions do not require treatment. When they are treated, there is the potential for harm but little potential for benefit. The ERASE algorithm can help clinicians to Evaluate diagnoses through the consideration of Resolved conditions, Ageing normally and Selecting appropriate targets to Eliminate unnecessary diagnoses and associated medicines. Undiagnosing relies on accurate and comprehensive medical records to inform a thorough review of diagnoses.

Medication overuse headaches 

Medication overuse headaches, also known as rebound headaches, are caused by the overuse of pain-relieving drugs for headaches, such as migraine headaches.

See also 

 Antimicrobial resistance

References

External links
 
 
 
 
 
 

Drugs
Medical error
Unnecessary health care